Diogo Daniel Pires Brás (born 16 March 2000) is a Portuguese footballer who plays for Feirense as a forward.

Football career
On 14 March 2018, Brás made his professional debut with Sporting B in a 2017–18 LigaPro match against Penafiel.

On 4 August 2022, Brás signed with Feirense in Liga Portugal 2.

References

External links

2000 births
People from Chaves, Portugal
Sportspeople from Vila Real District
Living people
Portuguese footballers
Portugal youth international footballers
Association football forwards
Sporting CP B players
C.D. Feirense players
Liga Portugal 2 players